The Constitution of Ireland has been amended 32 times since its adoption in 1937. Numerous other amendment bills have been introduced in Dáil Éireann but were not enacted. These include government bills passed by the Dáil and Seanad but rejected at referendum; bills which the government introduced but later decided not to proceed with; and the rest were private member's bills (PMBs), usually introduced by opposition TDs. No amendment PMBs passed second stage until 2015.

List of amendments

Notes

Missing numbers
A new bill to amend the constitution is usually named with the ordinal number next after that of the last amendment passed. Multiple pending bills will often use the same number, and be distinguished by year of introduction and/or a parenthetical number or description. However, if the government introduces multiple bills, these are numbered consecutively. There are several gaps in the numbering of passed amendments, corresponding to government bills which did not pass:
Twelfth Amendments 12, 13, and 14, all relating to abortion, were put to referendums on the same day. The 12th was rejected while the 13th and 14th passed.
Twenty-second Amendments 21, 22, 23, and 24 were introduced in the Dáil on the same day, with a view to being passed quickly through the Oireachtas. Three proved uncontroversial, but the 22nd was delayed after complaints from opposition parties. By the time the government decided not to proceed with the 22nd bill, the 23rd had passed at referendum.
Twenty-fourth and Twenty-fifth After the 24th bill was rejected at referendum in 2001, the government decided not to re-use the number when introducing the 25th bill later that year. Similarly, after the 25th was rejected in 2002, the government's next amendment bill was numbered 26 rather than 25 or 24. By contrast, when the 28th amendment bill of 2008 was rejected at referendum, the government chose to re-use the number 28 for the amendment bill passed the following year.
Thirty-second The 32nd and 33rd bills were put to referendum on 4 October 2013; the 32nd was rejected while the 33rd was approved.
Thirty-fifth The government's 35th bill was rejected at a referendum on 22 May 2015. Government amendments 36 and  37 were passed in 2018. The 38th Amendment was a private member's bill introduced in 2016 with number 35, which had its number changed to 38 in 2019 after being accepted by the government, which was passed in May 2019.

References

Sources

Citations

 
Ireland law-related lists
Republic of Ireland politics-related lists